Acacia latzii, also known as Latz's wattle and Tjilpi wattle, is a shrubby tree of the genus Acacia (in the family Fabaceae and the subgenus Plurinerves). It is native to the Finke bioregion (in the south of the Northern Territory and the north of South Australia).

Description 
The branchlets may be smooth or  have a sparse covering of minute flat lying hairs. They are leathery and a khaki to greyish green and like the branchlets may be smooth or have a sparse covering of fine hairs. They have  many closely parallel veins. The flower stalks are  5–9 mm long and have a covering of fine hairs. The heads are globular ( in diameter) with 13 to 18 flowers. The flowers are 5-merous and the  sepals are free. It flowers from April to August and fruits from February to November.

Habitat 
It is found  growing in skeletal alkaline soil in gullies and on minor hill slopes.

Conservation status
It has been declared "vulnerable" under both Commonwealth and Northern Territory legislation. It is threatened by
increased fire exposure associated with Buffel Grass invasion;
seedling loss from browsing and trampling by cattle and feral herbivores;
vulnerable to decline due its small population and its fragmented distribution;
altered rainfall patterns (due to climate change) which may affect adult survivorship and decrease the rare recruitment events.

Taxonomy
It was first described by Bruce Maslin in 1980 and named A. latzii to honour Peter Latz whose "fine" collections 
were the basis of Maslin's descriptions. An isotype, CANB 267113.1, was collected by Latz in the Beddome Range, New Crown Station, on 21 April 1977

References

latzii
Flora of South Australia
Flora of the Northern Territory
Plants described in 1980
Taxa named by Bruce Maslin